WMG Academy for Young Engineers is a University Technical College in the Canley area of Coventry, England. The college opened in 2014 on a site adjacent to The Westwood Academy.

Trust
The WMG Academy trust has two academies: the first opened in Coventry in September 2014, and the second at Solihull in September 2016. The trust's board is chaired by former CEO of Rover and RM John Leighfield, and the executive leadership consists of Kate Tague (Executive Principal), Fiesal Mahroof (Associate Principal Coventry), Dan Thompson (Assistant Principal Coventry),  Stewart Tait (Principal Solihull) and Claire Morris (Assistant Principal Solihull)

Sponsors
The UTC's sponsors include WMG, University of Warwick, and the major local employer Jaguar Land Rover, together with local firms such as OLEO Savery and Automotive Insulations, and national companies including Bosch and National Grid.

Academics
UTCs take students at the age of 14 (Key Stage 4) and 16 (Key Stage 5). The academy focuses on technical education. In Key Stage 4, the curriculum focuses on STEM subjects. Before being admitted students attend a guidance interview to discuss their career path and the most appropriate programme of study.

See also
The Westwood Academy
WMG Academy for Young Engineers, Solihull

References

External links
  
  Y10 Curriculum Booklet 2021-22
 Y12-Curriculum-Booklet-2021-22

University Technical Colleges
Secondary schools in Coventry
Educational institutions established in 2014
2014 establishments in England
University of Warwick